Estádio José Raimundo Roseno Araújo is a stadium located in Parauapebas, Brazil. It is used mostly for football matches and hosts the home matches of Atlético Paraense and Parauapebas. The stadium has a maximum capacity of 10,000 people.

References

External links
Rosenão on OGol
Rosenão on Federação Paraense de Futebol

Football venues in Pará